The 1964 Women's Western Open was a golf tournament contested from March 19–22 at Scenic Hills Country Club. It was the 35th edition of the Women's Western Open.

This event was won by Carol Mann.

Final leaderboard

External links
Spokane Daily Chronicle source
Times Daily source

Women's Western Open
Golf in Florida
Sports competitions in Florida
Women's Western Open
Women's Western Open
Women's Western Open
Women's Western Open
Women's sports in Florida